Idiosepiidae is a family of mollusc in the class Cephalopoda. This family appears to be related to the cuttlefish in the order Sepiida and the bobtail squid in the order Sepiolida but the exact placement of this family within the Decapodiformes is incertae sedis. The family includes the species Idiosepius pygmaeus (Tropical Pigmy squid).

Genera
Idiosepius Steenstrup, 1881
Xipholeptos Reid & Strugnell, 2018

References

Bobtail squid
Taxa named by Adolf Appellöf